Q School 2018 – Event 2 was the second of three qualifying tournaments for the 2018–19 snooker season. It took place from 20 to 25 May 2018 at the Meadowside Leisure Center in Burton-upon-Trent, England. Four players (Winners of each of the four sections) qualify for a two-year place on the World Snooker Tour.

Format
The tournament consisted of players being randomly assigned to four sections. Each section plays in the knockout system with the winner of each section earning a two-year tour card to play on the main tour for the 2018–19 snooker season and 2019–20 snooker season. All matches were the best-of-7.

Main draw

Milliard

Section 1
Round 1

Section 2
Round 1

Section 3
Round 1

Section 4
Round 1

Century breaks
Total: 29

 136  David Lilley 
 132, 101  Michael Judge
 132  Lucky Vatnani
 131  Ashley Carty
 129, 111  Lu Ning
 124, 105  Kishan Hirani
 123  Andy Hicks
 117  Jackson Page
 115 
 114  Shane Castle
 111  Jake Nicholson
 110  Hans Blanckaert
 110  Adam Duffy
 109  Craig Steadman
 108, 104 
 107  Wang Zepeng
 106  Jamie Cope
 104  David Grace
 103  Farakh Ajaib
 103  Louis Heathcote 
 102  Kuldesh Johal
 101  Andy Lee
 100  Fang Xiongman
 100  Sydney Wilson
 100  Brian Ochoiski

References

Snooker competitions in England
Q School (snooker)
2018 in snooker
2018 in English sport
Sport in Burton upon Trent
May 2018 sports events in the United Kingdom